The isovanilloids are compounds which possess an isovanillyl group. They include isovanillyl alcohol, isovanillin, isovanillic acid, iso-acetovanillon, etc. They are isomers of the vanilloids.

{| class="wikitable" style="text-align:center; font-size:90%"
|-
|  ||  ||  || 
|-
| isovanillyl alcohol || isovanillin || isovanillic acid || iso-acetovanillon
|}

Literature 
 

Phenols
Phenol ethers